Imanabad-e Sofla (also Romanized as Īmānābād-e Soflá) is a village in Iran, located in Nurali Rural District, in the Central District of Delfan County, Lorestan Province. At the 2006 census, its population was 27, in 8 families.

References 

Towns and villages in Delfan County